Glyceollin III is a glyceollin, a type of pterocarpan, found in the soybean (Glycine max). It has an antiestrogenic effect. In soil, it has an antifungal activity against Aspergillus sojae.

References

Antiestrogens
Pterocarpans